Leucheria suaveolens, the vanilla daisy, is a species of flowering plant in the family Asteraceae. It is endemic to Falkland Islands. Its natural habitats are temperate shrubland, rocky areas, and rocky shores. It is threatened by habitat loss.

References

Nassauvieae
Flora of the Falkland Islands
Least concern plants
Plants described in 1826
Taxonomy articles created by Polbot